Cascas is a town in Northern Peru, capital of Gran Chimú Province in La Libertad Region.

Cascas is an idyllic little city of 5000 people located in the mountains of the state of La Libertad, Peru. Located only 2 hours drive from the capital city of Trujillo, it is an easy bus trip with a variety of companies offering safe journeys on a 7-day-a-week basis. The primary industry and source of revenue of Cascas is the growing of grapes and the subsequent production of wine.

History

The earliest evidence of occupation in the area date back to the formative period of Cascas (petroglyphs, cave paintings). It has also been found in various parts of the province, ceramic of the Cupisnique, Mochica, Chimu, Caxamarca culture, and some evidence to demonstrate that Cascas hosted a peaceful and progressive regional lordship. Caxcax (As settlement of Indians) existed since ancient times, which are lost in time. Later, with the arrival of the Spanish, they founded the San Gabriel Caxcax people, as evidenced by official documents from the colonial era. However, the fate assigned to Cascas, prominent place in history. Its geographic location has served as a transit between the peoples of the northern highlands and the coast.

Gastronomy

Northern pisco sour
In Peru the abundant production of pisco in Cascas allowed to offer a Pisco Sour norteño.

Casquino wine
Since 1975 there is a saying that says "if it came to Cascas and took no wine, then why did he come". Grape is produced throughout the year. Wines of all types from malbec to special sacramental wine.

People from Cascas

Luis A. Diaz, M.D. - Professor of Dermatology at the University of North Carolina

References

External links
 http://www.med.unc.edu/derm/the-department/luis-diaz-md

See also
 La Libertad Region
 Gran Chimú Province
 Trujillo, Peru

Populated places in La Libertad Region